Arredondo is a municipality located in the autonomous community of Cantabria, Spain. According to the 2007 census, the city has a population of 569 inhabitants.

The town of Arredondo is known as "La Capital del Mundo" (The Capital of the World).

Towns
Alisas
Arredondo (Capital)
Asón
El Avellanal
La Iglesia
Rocías
La Roza
Socueva
Tabladillo
Val del Asón

References

External links

Municipalities in Cantabria